Wilbur is both a surname and a given name. Notable people with the name include:

Surname
 Cornelia B. Wilbur (1908–1992), American psychiatrist
 Crane Wilbur (1886–1973), American writer, actor and director of stage, radio and screen
 Curtis D. Wilbur (1867–1954), US Secretary of the Navy and Chief Justice of California
 George P. Wilbur (born 1941), actor and stuntman
 Jay Wilbur (1898–1970), British bandleader
 John Wilbur (disambiguation)
 Ray Lyman Wilbur (1875–1949), American doctor, president of Stanford University and United States Secretary of the Interior
 Richard Wilbur (1921–2017), United States Poet Laureate and two-time Pulitzer Prize winner
 Richard C. Wilbur (1936–2020), judge of the United States Tax Court
 Sylvia Wilbur (born 1938), British computer scientist
 Todd Wilbur, American cookbook author
 William Wilbur, New York politician
 William H. Wilbur (1888–1979), US Army brigadier general

Given name
 Wilbur Cave (fl. 1970s–2000s), American politician from South Carolina
 Wilbur Clark (1908–1965), American businessman and owner of hotels and casinos
 Wilbur Cobb (1929–2020), American jazz drummer
 Wilbur J. Cohen (1913–1987), American social scientist and, as a civil servant, one of the key architects of the welfare state
 Wilbur Cooper (1892–1973), Major League Baseball pitcher
 Wilbur Lucius Cross (1862–1948), American educator and Governor of Connecticut
 Wilbur Good (1885–1963), Major League Baseball player
 Wilbur Jackson (born 1951), American collegiate and National Football League running back
 Wilbur MacDonald (born 1933), Canadian politician
 Wilbur Mills (1909–1992), influential member of the United States House of Representatives from Arkansas
 Wilbur Ross (born 1937), American investor and 39th Secretary of Commerce
 Wilbur Schramm (1907–1987), American journalist and academic sometimes called the "father of communication studies"
 Wilbur Shaw (1902–1954), American racing driver
 Wilbur Smith (1933–2021), South African novelist
 Wilbur Soot (born 1996), English YouTuber, Twitch streamer, and musician
 Wilbur Sweatman (1882–1961), African-American ragtime and dixieland jazz composer, bandleader and clarinetist
 Wilbur J. Thomas (1920–1947), American combat pilot
 Wilbur Thomas (fl. 1970s), American former basketball player
 Wilbur Ware (1923–1979), American jazz double-bassist
 Wilbur Wood (born 1941), former Major League Baseball pitcher
 Wilbur Wright (1867–1912), one of the two brothers generally credited with inventing the first successful airplane
 Wilbur Young (1949–2014), American football player

Fictional characters
 Wilbur, the pig who is the main character in the book Charlotte's Web by E.B. White
 Wilbur Grey, a character portrayed by Lou Costello in Abbott and Costello Meet Frankenstein
 Wilbur T. Huggins, the principal of Royal Woods Elementary School in The Loud House
 Wilbur Mercer, a prophetic character from the novel Do Androids Dream of Electric Sheep? by Philip K. Dick
 Wilbur Post, Mister Ed's owner
 Wilbur Robinson, a character from Disney's Meet the Robinsons
 Wilbur Turnblad, a character from the Broadway musical Hairspray and its 2007 film adaptation
 Wilbur Whateley, an antagonist in H.P. Lovecraft's The Dunwich Horror
 Wilbur the albatross, in the 1990 Disney film The Rescuers Down Under
 Wilbur the Wildcat, the athletic mascot of the University of Arizona
 Wilbur Wonka, Willy Wonka’s father and a dentist in Charlie and the Chocolate Factory (film)
 Wilbur, Orville's younger brother and a pilot for Dodo Airlines in Animal Crossing: New Horizons
 Wilbur the Warthog, a character in  the Madagascar video game

See also
Wilber (given name)
Wilber (surname)

English-language surnames 
English masculine given names